Zaranga pannosa is a moth of the family Notodontidae first described by Frederic Moore in 1884. It is found in Asian countries including India, Nepal, Pakistan, China, Taiwan and Japan.

The wingspan is 52–70 mm.

Subspecies
Zaranga pannosa necopinatus
Zaranga pannosa pannosa

External links
naris.go.kr

Notodontidae